Quest Academy is an independent school for intellectually gifted students located in Palatine, Illinois. The school is accredited by the Independent Schools Association of the Central States, and it is a member of the National Association of Independent Schools and the National Association for Gifted Children.

There are two classes per grade. and two pre-kindergarten classes. the curriculum taught to each grade two years above the typical grade level.

History 

The school, first known as Creative Children's Academy, was started in 1982. The school was awarded full accreditation by the ISACS in 1988.

In 1993, the park district which then owned the school's facility announced its decision to raze the building. Two school administrators agreed to share the school board's purchase of the former Palatine Public Library, which would be remodelled into a school facility, as well as the head of school position. The school's name was changed to Quest Academy in 1999 and a capital campaign funded the addition of a gymnasium and performing arts wing.

Extracurricular activities 

Quest Academy's middle school athletic teams include boys' and girls' cross country, basketball, soccer, volleyball, and track.

The student council program is called the Knight Program. To become a knight, students must be courteous and follow twelve specified character traits while also doing a "knight" project. School-wide "pageant" assemblies are held where new knights and "squires" are recognized. To be a knight or squire, you must demonstrate the character traits.

Choir is a required subject through fifth grade, but many students choose to continue through eighth grade, with nearly two-thirds of the fifth through eighth-grade students participating.  There are three choirs at Quest: The Benton Street Boys (Boys only), Bella Voce (girls only), and Chamber, though Chamber is the only auditioned choir. As a part of the curriculum, eighth-graders are required to perform in a musical. Past musicals include "Beauty and the Beast", "Peter Pan" and "Mary Poppins".

Quest also competes in several math competitions, including The Latin School of Chicago, AMC 8 and Mathcounts.

Quest Academy gifted curriculum covers mathematics, LASS (Language Arts and Social Studies are not combined in middle school), art, drama, science, music, Spanish, technology, and library. Elective trimester-long classes are also offered several days a week.

Middle School students may participate in weekly flexes, furthering their knowledge of the arts.

References

External links 
Quest Academy
Independent Schools Association of the Central States

Educational institutions established in 1982
Private elementary schools in Cook County, Illinois
Gifted education
Schools in Lake County, Illinois
Palatine, Illinois
1982 establishments in Illinois